Clipper Mills (also, Clipper Mill) is a census-designated place in Butte County, California. It lies at an elevation of 3550 feet (1082 m).  Clipper Mills has a post office, first established in 1861 and moved in 1891. Its zip code is 95930. Clipper Mills's population was 142 at the 2010 census.

Clipper Mills' history and economy is centered on the lumber industry. A sawmill started operating nearby in 1852, and by 1855 Clipper Mills had its own sawmills.

Demographics

At the 2010 census Clipper Mills had a population of 142. The racial makeup of Clipper Mills was 131 (92.3%) White, 0 (0.0%) African American, 3 (2.1%) Native American, 0 (0.0%) Asian, 0 (0.0%) Pacific Islander, 2 (1.4%) from other races, and 6 (4.2%) from two or more races. Hispanic or Latino of any race were 5 people (3.5%).

The whole population lived in households, no one lived in non-institutionalized group quarters and no one was institutionalized.

There were 77 households, 9 (11.7%) had children under the age of 18 living in them, 26 (33.8%) were opposite-sex married couples living together, 8 (10.4%) had a female householder with no husband present, 2 (2.6%) had a male householder with no wife present.  There were 10 (13.0%) unmarried opposite-sex partnerships, and 2 (2.6%) same-sex married couples or partnerships. 33 households (42.9%) were one person and 18 (23.4%) had someone living alone who was 65 or older. The average household size was 1.84.  There were 36 families (46.8% of households); the average family size was 2.39.

The age distribution was 13 people (9.2%) under the age of 18, 10 people (7.0%) aged 18 to 24, 17 people (12.0%) aged 25 to 44, 57 people (40.1%) aged 45 to 64, and 45 people (31.7%) who were 65 or older.  The median age was 55.4 years. For every 100 females, there were 105.8 males.  For every 100 females age 18 and over, there were 104.8 males.

There were 148 housing units at an average density of ,of which 77 were occupied, 63 (81.8%) by the owners and 14 (18.2%) by renters.  The homeowner vacancy rate was 0%; the rental vacancy rate was 22.2%.  120 people (84.5% of the population) lived in owner-occupied housing units and 22 people (15.5%) lived in rental housing units.

Climate
This region experiences warm (but not hot) and dry summers, with no average monthly temperatures above 71.6 °F.  According to the Köppen Climate Classification system, Clipper Mills has a warm-summer Mediterranean climate, abbreviated "Csb" on climate maps.

References

Census-designated places in Butte County, California
Census-designated places in California
1850s establishments in California